Sarothrocrepis is a genus of beetles in the family Carabidae.

Species 
Sarothrocrepis contains the following 121 species:

 Sarothrocrepis anchora Baehr, 2018
 Sarothrocrepis andrewesi Jedlicka, 1934
 Sarothrocrepis angulipennis Baehr, 2018
 Sarothrocrepis archerensis Baehr, 2018
 Sarothrocrepis athertonensis Baehr, 2018
 Sarothrocrepis atriceps Baehr, 2018
 Sarothrocrepis baitetae Baehr, 2018
 Sarothrocrepis basinigra Baehr, 2018
 Sarothrocrepis benefica (Newman, 1842)
 Sarothrocrepis bickeli Baehr, 2018
 Sarothrocrepis bribieana Baehr, 2018
 Sarothrocrepis brittoni Baehr, 2018
 Sarothrocrepis callidiformis Baehr, 2018
 Sarothrocrepis cantrelli Baehr, 2018
 Sarothrocrepis carnavona Baehr, 2018
 Sarothrocrepis cheesmannae Baehr, 2018
 Sarothrocrepis civica (Newman, 1840)
 Sarothrocrepis corticalis (Fabricius, 1801)
 Sarothrocrepis dimidiata Macleay, 1888
 Sarothrocrepis distinguenda Baehr, 2018
 Sarothrocrepis doyeni Baehr, 2018
 Sarothrocrepis elegans (Blackburn, 1901)
 Sarothrocrepis eudloensis Baehr, 2018
 Sarothrocrepis expansicollis Baehr, 2018
 Sarothrocrepis fasciata Macleay, 1871
 Sarothrocrepis fragilis (Blackburn, 1901)
 Sarothrocrepis gravis (Blackburn, 1901)
 Sarothrocrepis gressitti Baehr, 2018
 Sarothrocrepis heathlandica Baehr, 2018
 Sarothrocrepis hippocrepis Baehr, 2018
 Sarothrocrepis howea Baehr, 2018
 Sarothrocrepis humeralis Baehr, 2018
 Sarothrocrepis humerata Sloane, 1900
 Sarothrocrepis immaculata Baehr, 2018
 Sarothrocrepis inquinata (Erichson, 1842)
 Sarothrocrepis integra Baehr, 2018
 Sarothrocrepis javanica Emden, 1937
 Sarothrocrepis kalbarri Baehr, 2018
 Sarothrocrepis keepensis Baehr, 2018
 Sarothrocrepis kimberleyana Baehr, 2018
 Sarothrocrepis krikkeni Baehr, 2018
 Sarothrocrepis lacertensis Baehr, 2018
 Sarothrocrepis lacustris Baehr, 2018
 Sarothrocrepis lamingtonensis Baehr, 2018
 Sarothrocrepis laticollis Baehr, 2018
 Sarothrocrepis latior Baehr, 2018
 Sarothrocrepis latipalpis Baehr, 2018
 Sarothrocrepis lemannae Baehr, 2018
 Sarothrocrepis liturata Macleay, 1888
 Sarothrocrepis longitarsis Baehr, 2018
 Sarothrocrepis luctuosa (Newman, 1842)
 Sarothrocrepis m-fascigera Baehr, 2018
 Sarothrocrepis m-maculata Baehr, 2018
 Sarothrocrepis m-nigrum Jordan, 1894
 Sarothrocrepis macularis Baehr, 2018
 Sarothrocrepis major Baehr, 2018
 Sarothrocrepis marginalis Baehr, 2018
 Sarothrocrepis mastersii Macleay, 1871
 Sarothrocrepis melanopyga Baehr, 2018
 Sarothrocrepis missai Baehr, 2018
 Sarothrocrepis monteithi Baehr, 2018
 Sarothrocrepis moreheadensis Baehr, 2018
 Sarothrocrepis moretona Baehr, 2018
 Sarothrocrepis nebulosa Baehr, 2018
 Sarothrocrepis nelsonensis Baehr, 2018
 Sarothrocrepis nigricincta Baehr, 2018
 Sarothrocrepis nigricollis Baehr, 2018
 Sarothrocrepis nigromarginata Baehr, 2018
 Sarothrocrepis nitens Baehr, 2018
 Sarothrocrepis notabilis Macleay, 1888
 Sarothrocrepis notata Macleay, 1888
 Sarothrocrepis novaecaledoniae Baehr, 2018
 Sarothrocrepis obsoleta (Blackburn, 1892)
 Sarothrocrepis obtusa Sloane, 1917
 Sarothrocrepis occidentalis Baehr, 2018
 Sarothrocrepis oenpelli Baehr, 2018
 Sarothrocrepis ornata Baehr, 2018
 Sarothrocrepis ovipennis Baehr, 2018
 Sarothrocrepis pallida Macleay, 1871
 Sarothrocrepis palumae Baehr, 2018
 Sarothrocrepis papua Darlington, 1968
 Sarothrocrepis paraburdoo Baehr, 2018
 Sarothrocrepis paracorticalis Baehr, 2018
 Sarothrocrepis parvicollis (Blackburn, 1894)
 Sarothrocrepis peninsulae Baehr, 2018
 Sarothrocrepis permutata Baehr, 2018
 Sarothrocrepis piceitarsis Baehr, 2018
 Sarothrocrepis poonae Baehr, 2018
 Sarothrocrepis posticalis (Guerin-Meneville, 1830)
 Sarothrocrepis promontoryi Baehr, 2018
 Sarothrocrepis pronotalis Baehr, 2018
 Sarothrocrepis psittacina Baehr, 2018
 Sarothrocrepis queenslandica Baehr, 2018
 Sarothrocrepis riedeli Baehr, 2018
 Sarothrocrepis sagittaria Baehr, 2018
 Sarothrocrepis scripta Baehr, 2018
 Sarothrocrepis serriplaga Baehr, 2018
 Sarothrocrepis setulosa Sloane, 1911
 Sarothrocrepis shannonensis Baehr, 2018
 Sarothrocrepis similis Baehr, 2018
 Sarothrocrepis simulans Baehr, 2018
 Sarothrocrepis sinuata Baehr, 2018
 Sarothrocrepis sinuatifasciata Baehr, 2018
 Sarothrocrepis sparsepilosa Baehr, 2018
 Sarothrocrepis storeyi Baehr, 2018
 Sarothrocrepis suavis Blackburn, 1890
 Sarothrocrepis sundaica Baehr, 2018
 Sarothrocrepis suturalis Baehr, 2018
 Sarothrocrepis tarsalis Baehr, 2018
 Sarothrocrepis tolgae Baehr, 2018
 Sarothrocrepis transversa Baehr, 2018
 Sarothrocrepis tridens (Newman, 1840)
 Sarothrocrepis unimaculata Baehr, 2018
 Sarothrocrepis variegata Baehr, 2018
 Sarothrocrepis vicina Baehr, 2018
 Sarothrocrepis warrumbungle Baehr, 2018
 Sarothrocrepis webbensis Baehr, 2018
 Sarothrocrepis welleslyana Baehr, 2018
 Sarothrocrepis werrikimbe Baehr, 2018
 Sarothrocrepis westralis Baehr, 2018
 Sarothrocrepis wilcanniae Baehr, 2018

References

Lebiinae